Coolray Field  (formerly known as Gwinnett Stadium) is a 10,427-seat minor league baseball park in unincorporated Gwinnett County, Georgia (with a mailing address in Lawrenceville).  It is the home field of the Gwinnett Stripers, the Triple-A affiliate of the Atlanta Braves.

History
Coolray Field hosted its first regular season baseball game on April 17, 2009, a 7–4 Gwinnett Braves loss to the Norfolk Tides. The stadium site is located approximately two miles (3 km) east of the Mall of Georgia along Georgia 20, between Interstate 85 and Georgia 316.

The  site was previously farmland and forest. An additional  of mostly forest around it became a mixed-use project, after a February 2009 rezoning by the Gwinnett County Commission. Naming rights are held by Coolray, an air conditioning and plumbing company based in nearby Marietta.

The stadium construction and maintenance is being paid by the taxpayer-funded Gwinnett County government, but the Stripers will keep most of the revenue from ticket and concession stand sales. The municipal bonds used to pay for the stadium run for 30 years (until 2038), but the Stripers have an option to back out of the contract after only half of that time (in 2023), if the county does not maintain the facility at an acceptable level. This would leave county taxpayers responsible for the remainder.

After the first season, it was revealed that parking revenue was a fraction (about 15%) of what was expected.

The Gwinnett Braves (renamed to the Stripers in 2017) moved to the stadium in 2009 when the Atlanta Braves moved their affiliate, the Richmond Braves, after 43 seasons (1966–2008) in Richmond, Virginia.  They are located 35 miles northeast of their parent club's stadium, Truist Park in unincorporated Cobb County—the second-shortest distance between a Triple-A team and its major league parent (behind only the Triple-A West's Tacoma Rainiers, based 26 miles south of Seattle). They have held this distinction since moving to Gwinnett County; the Braves played at Turner Field in Atlanta at the time.

Features
Coolray Field features 19 luxury suites, a 30-foot-by-40-foot video board in right-center field, a 6-foot-by-42-foot LED board along the left-field wall and chairback seating complete with cupholders.

References

External links

 Coolray Field
 
 
 

Sports venues in Georgia (U.S. state)
Buildings and structures in Gwinnett County, Georgia
Sports venues completed in 2009
Baseball venues in Georgia (U.S. state)
Soccer venues in Georgia (U.S. state)
2009 establishments in Georgia (U.S. state)
Gwinnett Stripers
International League ballparks